Christmas Collection is the second Christmas album from The Gaither Vocal Band. Spring Hill Music Group released the album on October 9, 2015.

Critical reception

Awarding the album four stars from CCM Magazine, Andy Argyrakis states, "it’s a diverse blend of dynamic voices sung in perfect harmony."

Chart performance
The album placed at No. 2 on the Billboard magazine Holiday Albums chart.

Track listing

Chart performance

References

2015 Christmas albums
Christmas albums by American artists